The 1190s was a decade of the Julian Calendar which began on January 1, 1190, and ended on December 31, 1199.

Significant people

References